The 2007 Australian Open was a Grand Slam tennis tournament held in Melbourne, Australia from 15 January until 28 January 2007.

The total prize pool was set at exactly A$20 million, with the winners of both the men's and women's singles competition each receiving A$1,281,000. Over 500 players competed in 2007. The main draw for singles and doubles was released on Friday 12 January 2007.

In Mixed Doubles, the scoring system was changed. Should both teams in a match become one set apiece, a match tie break will take part in the final set where the first team to score ten points wins the match. If the score for the match tie break becomes 9–9, a difference by two is required to win the game (e.g. 11–9, 12–10, etc.).

Notable stories

New technology used in line-calling

This was the first time that the tournament used the Hawk-Eye system in an official line-calling capacity, as an auxiliary to the human line judges. Players were given the opportunity to challenge a human line call if they believed it to be incorrect, by having Hawk-Eye confirm or overrule the original call. The system was installed on only one court being used for the tournament, in the Rod Laver Arena.

At the beginning of a set, the players were each given the opportunity to incorrectly challenge a maximum of two line calls during the set. A player who still had some incorrect challenges remaining was allowed to make an unlimited number of correct challenges, but when a player had no incorrect challenges remaining, his or her opportunity to challenge line calls was lost. Players received an extra incorrect challenge during a tiebreak. The players regained both challenges at the beginning of each set and also after every 12 games in the final deciding set. Unused challenges did not carry over when this happened.

An additional aspect to the new system was that a video replay screen was installed inside the arena for the first time, to display the results of the challenges. The screen also allowed the spectators (and players themselves) to view instant replays that could previously only be seen by the television audience and those viewing the match on screens outside the stadium.  This implementation caused noticeable drama in a match between No. 2 Amélie Mauresmo and Olga Puchkova in which Mauresmo challenged the in call on Poutchkova's shot and the replay showed the ball out graphically but still called the ball in.

Factional fighting on day 1
On 15 January 2007, around one hundred and fifty Australian youths of Serbian, Croatian and Greek origins were ejected from the Open after brawling with one another in Garden Square at Melbourne Park. The brawl reportedly developed after fans taunted each other with nationalist slogans. According to The Age newspaper, twenty police tried to quell the disturbance, which allegedly developed after an informal understanding between some Serb and Croat fans — that the two groups would not attend on the same day — was broken. The two opposing groups were ejected out separate exits and escorted away from the venue in opposite directions by police. No arrests were made, and no charges were laid against any of the participants.

The Greek supporters protested that they had not been involved in the taunts exchanged between the Serb and Croat contingents, though The Age reported that some Greek supporters had sided with some Serbs and chanted, "Greece, Serbia! Greece, Serbia!" and "We must support our Orthodox brothers". Serb fans claimed that the violence had been provoked by Croat use of the Croatian national flag, which in their eyes carried connotations of Second World War fascism, while Croats claimed that the violence was provoked by Serbs shouting anti-Croat, pro-Serb chants.

A Croatian supporter suffered minor injuries in the ethnic brawl after being hit with a Serbian flagpole. People wearing Croatian or Serbian national colours were subsequently refused entry and the next day featured heightened security. Police in Victoria said that this sort of behaviour was never seen in the tournament before.

Weather conditions
Heat in excess of 40 degrees Celsius (104 degrees Fahrenheit) on Day 2 caused the Extreme Heat Policy to be implemented. Most daytime matches were delayed, and matches continued on outside courts till 3.30am the following morning. Janko Tipsarević chose to forfeit his match against David Nalbandian because of the heat. On Rod Laver Arena with the roof open, top-seeded Maria Sharapova nearly succumbed to the heat, losing a 5–0 lead in the final set, but managed to defeat Camille Pin 6–3. 4–6, 9–7.

During the night sessions on Day 3, the Australian Open was affected by rain delaying play.  Three men's matches were postponed in progress. The matches on Rod Laver Arena and Melbourne Arena were delayed for only 15 minutes while the retractable roofs closed.  Marat Safin wisely requested that play be suspended while noticeably out of the match against Dudi Sela with Sela up two sets to one, six games to five, and 30-30. After the delay, Safin returned to win the fourth set and then the final set 6–0 to advance. This was reminiscent of the match in the 2006 Australian Open in which Marcos Baghdatis advanced after appearing rejuvenated against David Nalbandian. The match on Rod Laver featuring women's number two Amélie Mauresmo and Olga Puchkova was barely underway when the rains came.

Rain on day six caused play to only proceed on the covered courts of Rod Laver Arena and Melbourne Arena, for the duration of the day. Thus, only high seeds Maria Sharapova, Rafael Nadal, Nikolay Davydenko, Kim Clijsters, James Blake, and Martina Hingis were able to play their matches, as well as Australians Alicia Molik and Lleyton Hewitt. Players scheduled for play on the outer courts had to wait until Day 7, and faced the possibility of playing on consecutive days for the winners. Initially only 10 matches were scheduled for play in Laver and Vodafone, but the match between Andy Murray and Juan Ignacio Chela was moved indoors, to leave only five delayed matches in men's and women's singles.

Seniors

Men's singles

 Roger Federer defeated  Fernando González, 7–6(7–2), 6–4, 6–4
It was Federer's 1st title of the year, and his 46th overall. It was his 10th career Grand Slam title, and his 3rd Australian Open title.

Women's singles

 Serena Williams defeated  Maria Sharapova, 6–1, 6–2

Men's doubles

 Bob Bryan /  Mike Bryan defeated  Jonas Björkman /  Max Mirnyi, 7–5, 7–5

Women's doubles

 Cara Black /  Liezel Huber defeated  Chan Yung-jan /  Chuang Chia-jung, 6–4, 6–7(4–7), 6–1

Mixed doubles

 Daniel Nestor /  Elena Likhovtseva defeated  Max Mirnyi /  Victoria Azarenka, 6–4, 6–4

Juniors

Boys' singles

 Brydan Klein defeated  Jonathan Eysseric, 6–2, 4–6, 6–1

Girls' singles

 Anastasia Pavlyuchenkova defeated  Madison Brengle, 7–6(8–6), 7–6(7–3)

Boys' doubles

 Graeme Dyce /  Harri Heliövaara defeated  Stephen Donald /  Rupesh Roy, 6–2, 6–7(4–7), 6–3

Girls' doubles

 Evgeniya Rodina /  Arina Rodionova defeated  Julia Cohen /  Urszula Radwańska, 2–6, 6–3, 6-1

Wheelchair

Men's wheelchair singles

 Shingo Kunieda defeated  Michaël Jérémiasz, 6–3, 3–6, 6–4

Women's wheelchair singles

 Esther Vergeer defeated  Florence Gravellier, 6–1, 6–0

Men's wheelchair doubles

 Robin Ammerlaan /  Shingo Kunieda defeated  Maikel Scheffers/  Ronald Vink, 6–2, 6–0

Women's wheelchair doubles

 Jiske Griffioen /  Esther Vergeer defeated  Florence Gravellier/  Korie Homan, 6–0, 3–6, [10–6]

Seeds
The seeded players are listed below with the round in which they exited.

Men
 Roger Federer (champion)
 Rafael Nadal (quarterfinals, lost to Fernando González)
 Nikolay Davydenko (quarterfinals, lost to Tommy Haas)
 Ivan Ljubičić (first round, lost to Mardy Fish)
 James Blake (fourth round, lost to Fernando González)
 Andy Roddick (semifinals, lost to Roger Federer)
 Tommy Robredo (quarterfinals, lost to Roger Federer)
 David Nalbandian (fourth round, lost to Tommy Haas)
 Mario Ančić (fourth round, lost to Andy Roddick)
 Fernando González (final, lost to Roger Federer)
 Marcos Baghdatis (second round, lost to Gaël Monfils)
 Tommy Haas (semifinals, lost to Fernando González)
 Tomáš Berdych (fourth round, lost to Nikolay Davydenko)
 Novak Djokovic (fourth round, lost to Roger Federer)
 Andy Murray (fourth round, lost to Rafael Nadal)
 David Ferrer (fourth round, lost to Mardy Fish)
 Jarkko Nieminen (second round, lost to Juan Ignacio Chela)
 Richard Gasquet (fourth round, lost to Tommy Robredo)
 Lleyton Hewitt (third round, lost to Fernando González)
 Radek Štěpánek (third round, lost to David Ferrer)
 Dmitry Tursunov (third round, lost to Tomáš Berdych)
 Dominik Hrbatý  (Third Round, lost to Mario Ančić)
 Robin Söderling (first round, lost to Florian Mayer)
 Juan Carlos Ferrero (second round, lost to Danai Udomchoke)
 Mikhail Youzhny (third round, lost to Roger Federer)
 Marat Safin (third round, lost to Andy Roddick)
 José Acasuso (first round, lost to Sam Querrey)
 Sébastien Grosjean (third round, lost to David Nalbandian)
 Xavier Malisse (first round, lost to Arnaud Clément)
 Agustín Calleri (first round, lost to Zack Fleishman)
 Stanislas Wawrinka (third round, lost to Rafael Nadal)
 Nicolás Almagro (first round, lost to Robby Ginepri)

Women
 Maria Sharapova (final, lost to Serena Williams)
 Amélie Mauresmo (fourth round, lost to Lucie Šafářová)
 Svetlana Kuznetsova (fourth round, lost to Shahar Pe'er)
 Kim Clijsters (semifinals, lost to Maria Sharapova)
 Nadia Petrova (third round, lost to Serena Williams)
 Martina Hingis (quarterfinals, lost to Kim Clijsters)
 Elena Dementieva (fourth round, lost to Nicole Vaidišová)
 Patty Schnyder (fourth round, lost to Anna Chakvetadze)
 Dinara Safina (third round, lost to Li Na)
 Nicole Vaidišová (semifinals, lost to Serena Williams)
 Jelena Janković (fourth round, lost to Serena Williams)
 Anna Chakvetadze (quarterfinals, lost to Maria Sharapova)
 Ana Ivanovic (third round, lost to Vera Zvonareva)
 Francesca Schiavone (second round, lost to Lucie Šafářová)
 Daniela Hantuchová (fourth round, lost to Kim Clijsters)
 Shahar Pe'er (quarterfinals, lost to Serena Williams)
 Anna-Lena Grönefeld (second round, lost to Ashley Harkleroad)
 Marion Bartoli (second round, lost to Victoria Azarenka)
 Li Na (fourth round, lost to Martina Hingis)
 Tatiana Golovin (third round, lost to Shahar Pe'er)
 Katarina Srebotnik (third round, lost to Casey Dellacqua)
 Vera Zvonareva (fourth round, lost to Maria Sharapova)
 Ai Sugiyama (second round, lost to Anastasiya Yakimova)
 Samantha Stosur (second round, lost to Jelena Kostanić Tošić)
 Anabel Medina Garrigues (first round, lost to Elena Vesnina)
 Maria Kirilenko (third round, lost to Svetlana Kuznetsova)
 Mara Santangelo (first round, lost to Serena Williams)
 Flavia Pennetta (first round, lost to Kaia Kanepi)
 Alona Bondarenko (third round, lost to Kim Clijsters)
 Tathiana Garbin (third round, lost to Maria Sharapova)
 Zheng Jie (first round, lost to Julia Schruff)
 Eleni Daniilidou ''(first round, lost to Aiko Nakamura)

Main draw wildcard entries

Men's singles
  Wayne Arthurs
  Chris Guccione
  Alun Jones
  Peter Luczak
  Sam Querrey
  Robert Smeets
  Go Soeda
  Jo-Wilfried Tsonga

Women's singles
  Monique Adamczak
  Madison Brengle
  Casey Dellacqua
  Youlia Fedossova
  Sophie Ferguson
  Alicia Molik
  Jessica Moore
  Iroda Tulyaganova

Men's doubles
  Wayne Arthurs /  Peter Luczak
  Paul Baccanello /  Chris Guccione
  Carsten Ball /  Adam Feeney
  Andrew Coelho /  Alun Jones
  Nathan Healey /  Robert Smeets
  Greg Jones /  Brydan Klein

Women's doubles
  Monique Adamczak /  Evie Dominikovic
  Lauren Breadmore /  Emily Hewson
  Chan Yung-jan /  Chuang Chia-jung 
  Casey Dellacqua /  Jessica Moore
  Daniella Dominikovic /  Sophie Ferguson
  Tatiana Golovin /  Alicia Molik
  Trudi Musgrave /  Christina Wheeler

Mixed doubles
  Monique Adamczak /  Stephen Huss
  Casey Dellacqua /  Chris Guccione
  Alicia Molik /  Paul Hanley
  Nicole Pratt /  Ashley Fisher
  Bryanne Stewart /  Nathan Healey

Qualifier entries

Men's qualifiers entries

  Alan Mackin 
  Zack Fleishman 
  Alexander Waske 
  Mischa Zverev 
   
  Michael Russell 
  Bobby Reynolds 
  Marco Chiudinelli 
  Marin Čilić 
  Michael Berrer 
  Dudi Sela 
  Paul Capdeville 
  Lukáš Lacko 
  Ilija Bozoljac 
  Brian Wilson 
  Alex Kuznetsov

Women's qualifiers entries

  Alizé Cornet 
  Alla Kudryavtseva 
   
  Sandra Záhlavová 
  Julia Vakulenko 
  Klára Zakopalová 
  Andreja Klepač 
  Jorgelina Cravero 
  Ahsha Rolle 
  Renata Voráčová 
  Anne Kremer 
  Tamira Paszek

Protected ranking
The following players were accepted directly into the main draw using a protected ranking: 

Men's Singles
  Victor Hănescu
  Joachim Johansson

Women's Singles
  Elena Bovina

Withdrawn players

Men's Singles
  Justin Gimelstob → replaced by  Jiří Vaněk
  Tim Henman → replaced by  Evgeny Korolev
  Nicolas Kiefer → replaced by  Danai Udomchoke
  Martin Verkerk → replaced by  Gilles Müller

Women's Singles
  Lindsay Davenport → replaced by  Tzipora Obziler
  Justine Henin-Hardenne → replaced by  Galina Voskoboeva
  María José Martínez Sánchez → replaced by  Yuan Meng
  Anastasia Myskina → replaced by  Stéphanie Foretz
  Venus Williams → replaced by  Emmanuelle Gagliardi

Attendance

Media coverage
Coverage of the 2007 Australian Open was as follows:

Television networks
Australia — Channel Seven (Live)
Australia — Fox Sports (Live)
Canada — TSN (Live and re-runs)
Europe — Eurosport (Live)
India — Star Sports (Live)
Latin America — ESPN (Live and re-runs)
Macedonia  — Macedonian Radio-Television
Netherlands — Sport 1 (Live)
Netherlands — Nederland 1 & Nederland 3 (Highlights)
New Zealand — SKY Sport (Live)
Singapore — ESPN (Live)
South Africa — Supersport
South America — ESPN (Live) & ESPN+ (Live)
United Kingdom — BBC One (Live – finals only)
United Kingdom — BBC Red Button (Live – evening sessions only)
United Kingdom — BBC Two (Live – Unscheduled coverage)
United States — ESPN2 & ESPN (Live)

Radio
United Kingdom — BBC Radio Five Live (Live)

Controversies and scandals
Three men were arrested for taking up-skirt photos inside Melbourne Park.
Police were summoned to investigate the sexual assault of a five-year-old boy in a toilet cubicle at the tournament.
Maria Sharapova was fined $2000 for allegations of sideline-coaching from her father, Yuri Sharapov in her match against Anna Chakvetadze.

See also
 2007 in tennis

References

External links

Australian Open official website

 
 

 
2007 in Australian tennis
January 2007 sports events in Australia
2007,Australian Open